Flim Flam Films is a 1927 silent animated short subject featuring Felix the Cat.

Plot
Felix tries to put three kittens to bed as part of their nap time. He then goes to the living room to chat with his iceweasel buddy. It appears the little cats are not sleepy as they cry in boredom. While Felix wonders what he should do, his friend offers a suggestion of taking the kittens to a cinema.

Felix and the kittens are off to a cinema in town. He tries to purchase tickets at a booth but it appears cats are not permitted in the theater as the seller shoos them away. They then disguise themselves as a man, and manage to buy a ticket without the seller realizing. Their disguise, however, does not keep them covered for long when a guard at the cinema entrance spots some bizarreness on top. Feeling completely exposed, they split up and flee. The four cats are still desperate in wanting watch as they sneak through a tiny opening in the cinema's walls. Finally inside, they get to see a film, and the one starring in it turns out to be Felix himself, much to the kittens' enjoyment. But when the Felix character in the film gets attacked by a lion, the angry kittens rush forth and assault the screen, therefore causing a commotion from the audience.

On a field just outside town, the kittens are weeping about never getting to watch something, and Felix is still wondering what he should do next. In no time Felix comes up with an idea, and tells the little cats that they should create their own film.

Hours later, Felix and the kittens return to the field, bringing with them a crank-operated movie camera. Using the device, Felix takes videos of a ballet dancer, a marching band, a rising hot air balloon, and a female swimmer in the lake whom Felix romances with. The kittens also take some shots too.

They then return home that night to watch the film they made. The characters in the film, however, appear upside down but Felix is able to make quick adjustments. It appears the female swimmer whom Felix dated is the iceweasel's girlfriend, much to the annoyance of that guy who's in attendance. The iceweasel mercilessly batters Felix. The kittens are too frightened to intervene, knowing the iceweasel is more powerful than the lion in the cinema film. Felix is left covered in a lot of bandages, an image he would display again in Whys and Other Whys.

See also
 Felix the Cat filmography

References

External links

1927 films
1927 animated films
1927 comedy films
1920s American animated films
1920s animated short films
Felix the Cat films
American silent short films
American black-and-white films
Films about filmmaking
Silent American comedy films
Films directed by Otto Messmer
Films set in a movie theatre
1920s English-language films